Anthony Arthur Crampton Blue (4 February 1936 – 1 October 2020) was an Australian middle-distance runner. He competed in the 800 metres at the 1960 Summer Olympics and the 1964 Summer Olympics. Blue won a bronze medal in the 880 yards at the 1962 British Empire and Commonwealth Games.

References

External links
 

1936 births
2020 deaths
Athletes (track and field) at the 1960 Summer Olympics
Athletes (track and field) at the 1964 Summer Olympics
Australian male middle-distance runners
Olympic athletes of Australia
Athletes (track and field) at the 1962 British Empire and Commonwealth Games
Commonwealth Games bronze medallists for Australia
Commonwealth Games medallists in athletics
Place of birth missing
Medallists at the 1962 British Empire and Commonwealth Games